Anaphase-promoting complex subunit 5 is an enzyme that in humans is encoded by the ANAPC5 gene.

The anaphase-promoting complex (APC) consists of at least 8 protein subunits, including APC5, CDC27 (APC3; MIM 116946), CDC16 (APC6; MIM 603461), and CDC23 (APC8; MIM 603462).[supplied by OMIM]

Interactions
ANAPC5 has been shown to interact with ANAPC1, ANAPC4, CDC27 and PABPC1.

References

External links

Further reading